The 2005 Chevy American Revolution 400 was the 11th stock car race of the 2005 NASCAR Nextel Cup Series season. It was held on Saturday, May 14, 2005, before a crowd of 107,000 watching the race at Richmond, Virginia at Richmond International Raceway. The 400-lap race was won by Kasey Kahne from Evernham Motorsports.

Background

Qualifying 
Kasey Kahne would win qualifying with a 20.775. Meanwhile, during Carl Long's run, he would spin and crash his car during his lap, causing him to not qualify for the race.

Race

Race results

References 

2005 NASCAR Nextel Cup Series
NASCAR races at Richmond Raceway
2005 in sports in Virginia
May 2005 sports events in the United States